Mantuan cuisine is the set of traditional dishes of the Italian province of Mantua, some of which date back to the time of the Gonzaga.

It is a cuisine bound to the land by peasant traditions, however it is very rich and varied. Differences can be found between local variants of the same dish.

Given the geographical position occupied by the province of Mantua, the Mantuan culinary tradition is similar to the Emilian cuisine where salami and pasta are more prevalent and to the Lombard cuisine, which makes more use of rice.

Antipasti 

The traditional Mantuan antipasto consists of cold cuts.

 Salame mantovano, with or without added fresh garlic
 Coppa
 Pancetta

Other popular cold cuts are:

 Gras pìstà, pork lardo minced with a knife and garlic
 Ciccioli or gréppole, pieces of cooked and dried pork and fat
 Culatello, from Parma (it is, however, also produced in some municipalities of Mantua)

Cold cuts are often accompanied by:

 Gnocco fritto, squares or rhombuses of bread dough fried in hot lard. It originates from the provinces of Modena and Reggio Emilia, only in recent times it has spread to the Mantova area, and it is better known with the name of "torta fritta" (fried cake) with which it is called in other areas of Emilia.
 Chisœla, typical savory focaccia
 Tirot, focaccia with onions originally from Felonica, typical of the Bassa
 Chisœlina, crispy and salty scone
 Luccio in salsa

First courses 

Soups with broth:

 Agnolini, egg pasta stuffed with beef, salami, chicken, breadcrumbs, Grana Padano cheese, nutmeg. There is also a variant stuffed with stewed beef.
 Tagliatelline, quadretti and maltagliati, egg pasta cut into thin strips
 Pasta trita, egg pasta dried and grated into very small pieces
 Panàda, made of stale bread, oil and Parmesan cheese
 Bevr'in vin
 Passatelli
 Mericonda

Dry first courses:

 Tortelli di zucca
 Tortelli amari, typically from Castel Goffredo
 Tagliatelle
 Gnocchi di zucca
 Capunsei, typically from Alto mantovano
 Risotto alla pilota, seasoned with salamella
 Risotto col puntèl, seasoned with salamella, ribs or pork chop
 Risotto with frogs, seasoned with cleaned frogs, oil and onion
 Risotto con i saltaréi, topped with fried crayfish

Second courses 

 Stracotto or brasato, made out of beef. It can be accompanied by polenta
 Stracotto d'asino, accompanied by polenta
 Bollito misto based on beef, chicken, and pork boiled in boiling water accompanied by mostarda
 Frittata con le rane
 Cotechino and pisto, accompanied by polenta and lentils
 Luccio in salsa, boiled freshwater fish accompanied by a sauce made of capers, parsley, salted anchovies, garlic and onion
 Black bullhead, typical of the areas near the Po river, it can be prepared fried or stewed.
 Roasted helmeted guineafowl

Side dishes:

 Peperonata
 Polenta
 Pollo alla Stefani

Desserts 

 Torta sbrisolona, crumbly almond cake
 Torta Elvezia
 Torta di tagliatelle
 Torta mantovana
 Torta margherita
 Torta delle rose
 Anello di Monaco
 Bussolano or bussolà
 Chisöl, sweet focaccia
 Turtei sguasarot
 Zabaione
 Sugolo
 Fiapòn
 Torta greca
 Papasìn
 Caldi dolci
 Bignolata
 Torta sabbiosa or Torta del 3

Wines 

 Colli Morenici Mantovani del Garda bianco
 Garda Colli Mantovani Cabernet
 Garda Colli Mantovani Merlot
 Garda Colli Mantovani Pinot Grigio
 Garda Colli Mantovani Tocai Italico
 Garda Colli Mantovani bianco
 Lambrusco Mantovano

Liquors 

 Nocino, liqueur common in Emilia and made with green walnuts. It must rest for some years before being consumed.

References

Bibliography 

  .
 
 
 
 Giancarlo Malagutti (a cura di), Mantova a tavola ogni giorno dell'anno. Raccontando la cucina attraverso il volgere delle stagioni.  Mantova, 1991. ISBN non esistente.

Related articles

Other projects 

 
 

Italian cuisine
Mantua
Mantua
Mantua